SM Town (stylized as SMTOWN) is a musical collective for the recording artists under South Korean entertainment company SM Entertainment.

SM Town artists have performed at the annual SM Town Live world tours since the SM Town Live '08 Asia tour in 2008. As of 2014, the SM Town Live concert series had cumulatively attracted over 1 million audience members.

Artists

Discography

Projects 
 2015–19: The Agit - Concert Series
 2016–present: SM Station

Studio albums

Compilation albums

Single albums

Single

Concerts

Concert tours 
 SM Town Live '08 (2008–09)
 SM Town Live '09 (2009; canceled)
 SM Town Live '10 World Tour (2010–11)
 SM Town Live World Tour III (2012–13)
 SM Town Live World Tour IV (2014–15)
 SM Town Live Tour V in Japan (2016)
 SM Town Live World Tour VI (2017–18)
 SM Town Live 2022: SMCU Express (2022)

Music festivals 
 SM Smile Concert China (2002)
 SM Smile Concert (2003)
 SM Summer Town Festival (July 15–17, 2006)
 SM Town Summer Concert (June 30 and July 1, 2007 – Olympic Gymnastics Arena)
 SM Town Week (2013)
SMile Music Festival (2015)

Others 
 SM Town Special Stage in Hong Kong (2017)
 SM Town Live 2018 In Osaka
 SM Town Live Special Stage in Santiago (2019)
 SM Town Live 2019 In Tokyo (2019)
 SM Town Live Culture Humanity (2021)
 SM Town Live 2022: SMCU Express at Kwangya (2022)
 SM Town Live 2023: SMCU Palace at Kwangya (2023)

Filmography 
 I AM.: SM Town Live World Tour in Madison Square Garden (May 10, 2012) - theme song: "Dear My Family"
 SM Town Live in Tokyo Special Edition in 3D (October 11, 2012)

SM Town Official Application
It is a mobile application launched by SM Entertainment for Android and iOS. It is the mobile version of SM Town's official website.

SuperStar SM Town

In August 2014, SM Entertainment launched a rhythm game available for Android and iOS called SuperStar SM Town, featuring SM Town artists' songs.

Notes

References

External links

 SM Entertainment official homepage 
 SM Entertainment official Japanese homepage 

 
K-pop music groups
South Korean idol groups
Musical groups established in 1999
South Korean pop music groups
Musical collectives
Musical groups from Seoul
Supergroups (music)
1999 establishments in South Korea